Nawang Gombu (1 May 1936 – 24 April 2011) was a Sherpa mountaineer who was the first man in the world to have climbed Mount Everest twice.

Gombu was born in Minzu, Tibet and later became an Indian citizen, as did many of his relatives including his uncle Tenzing Norgay.  He was the youngest Sherpa to reach 26,000 ft. In 1964, he became the first Indian and the third man in the world to summit Nanda Devi (24,645 ft). In 1965, he became the first man in the world to have climbed Mount Everest twice—a record that would remain unbroken for almost 20 years. First was with American Expedition in 1963 as the eleventh man in world  and the second was with Indian Everest Expedition 1965 as seventeenth.

Early life and background
Gombu was born in the Kharta region to the north-east of Everest. His early life was marked by the complexities of his parents' marriage. His father, Nawang, was a monk, the younger brother of the local feudal landowner. His mother, Tenzing's beloved older sister, was Lhamu Khipa, a nun from a family of serfs. The two eloped, causing a scandal, and for a time they lived in Khumbu, a Sherpa district on the other side of the border in Nepal.

As a young boy, Gombu was sent back to Tibet to become a monk at Rongbuk Monastery, an hour's walk below what is now Everest base camp. Gombu's grandmother was a cousin of the head lama, Trulshik Rinpoche, but the connection offered him no protection from the brutal punishment often meted out to novices who failed in their studies.

Career
After a year, Gombu fled with a friend, crossing the Nangpa La into Khumbu, where the first western visitors were beginning to explore the southern approaches to Everest.

He was the first man in the world to climb Everest twice with the Indian Expedition and American. No small feat as the record was not broken for a very long time. He climbed Mount Rainier numerous times and traveled extensively.

Nawang Gombu lived in Darjeeling, India, and spent his life at the Himalayan Mountaineering Institute retiring as an adviser there. He had four children and a wife Sita who lives in Darjeeling.

Honours and awards
He was awarded Arjuna award and Padma Bhushan  for his achievements.
Gombu attended reunions of climbs during the 1950s and 1960s as part of the 1963 Everest Expedition Celebrations. In 2006, he was awarded the Tenzing Norgay Lifetime Achievement Award in the field of Indian mountaineering by President APJ Abdul Kalam.

Gombu dedicated his later life to the Sherpa community, raising funds and being President of the Sherpa Buddhist Association for the past few years.

Awards

1953	–	Tiger Medal
1953	–	Queen Elizabeth II Coronation Medal
1963 	–	Hubbard Medal of the National Geographic Society, USA
1964 	– 	Padma Shree - India 
1965 	– 	Padma Bhushan – India 
1966 	– 	Indian Mountaineering Foundation's Gold Medal – India
1967 	– 	Arjuna Award – India
2006 	– 	Tenzing Norgay National Adventure Award – India

See also
Indian summiters of Mount Everest - Year wise
List of Mount Everest records of India
List of Mount Everest records
List of Mount Everest summiters by number of times to the summit

References

External links

 Online biography
 The Sherpas of Everest Series: Nawang Gombu Sherpa - EverestHistory.com
 Nawang Gombu: Mountain guide who became the first man to climb Everest twice - The Independent
 Stupa after legendary climber Nawang Gombu at HMI - Millennium Post
 Nawang Gombu: Heart of a Tiger - YouTube

1936 births
2011 deaths
Indian summiters of Mount Everest
Sherpa summiters of Mount Everest
Indian mountain climbers
Recipients of the Padma Bhushan in sports
Recipients of the Padma Shri in sports
Recipients of the Arjuna Award
Recipients of the Tenzing Norgay National Adventure Award
Recipients of Indian Mountaineering Foundation's Gold Medal